Prince Ludwig Friedrich of Saxe-Hildburghausen (11 September 1710, Hildburghausen – 10 June 1759, Nijmegen), was a Prince of Saxe-Hildburghausen and General Field Marshal in the Bavarian army.

Life 
Louis Frederick was the younger son of Duke Ernst Friedrich I of Saxe-Hildburghausen and his wife Countess Sophia Albertine of Erbach-Erbach.  In his youth he joined the Imperial military service and was trained by Friedrich Heinrich von Seckendorff.  In 1738, he was promoted to major general, in 1739 to Generalfeldwachtmeister.  Also in 1739, he participated in a campaign in Hungary against Turkey.  In 1741, he left the imperial service and joined the Bavarian army, where he played a role in the War of the Austrian Succession.  In 1742, he was promoted to General Field Marshal Lieutenant.  Emperor Charles VII gave him the infantry regiment Holnstein and in 1743 promoted him to General Field Marshal.  Also in 1743, when he was commander of the besieged town of Braunau am Inn, he minted tin and lead emergency coins.

Elector Maximilian III Joseph of Bavaria promoted him in 1745 to commander of all the Bavarian troops.  He continued fighting in the War of the Austrian Succession in 1746–1748 in the Netherlands, where he had his own regiment, named Hildburghausen.  In 1748, he resigned from Bavarian service and returned to his hometown.

He married on 4 May 1749 in Weikersheim Christiane Louise (1713–1778), daughter of Duke Joachim Frederick Holstein-Sonderburg-Plön and widow of Count Louis Albert of Hohenlohe-Weikersheim.  The marriage remained childless.  Through financial contributions of the house of Hohenlohe, the prince managed to complete an expensive restoration of Hellingen manor.  Pursued by creditors, he returned to active service in the Netherlands.

He died in 1759, as governor of Nijmegen.

Ancestors

References and sources 

 Heinrich Ferdinand Schoeppl: Die Herzoge von Sachsen-Altenburg, Bozen, 1917, reprinted Altenburg, 1992
 Oliver Heyn: Militärisches Prestige und finanzielle Absicherung. Die Herzöge von Sachsen-Hildburghausen im Dienst der Vereinigten Niederlande (1680-1760), in: Zeitschrift für Thüringische Geschichte 71 (2017), S. 45–72.
Dr. Rudolf Armin Human: Chronik der Stadt Hildburghausen, Hildburghausen, 1886

House of Saxe-Hildburghausen
House of Wettin
1710 births
1759 deaths
18th-century German people
Generals of the Holy Roman Empire
Recipients of the Order of the White Eagle (Poland)
Sons of monarchs